Caseinolytic peptidase B protein homolog (CLPB), also known as Skd3, is a mitochondrial AAA ATPase chaperone that in humans is encoded by the gene CLPB, which encodes an adenosine triphosphate-(ATP) dependent chaperone. Skd3 is localized in mitochondria and widely expressed in human tissues. High expression in adult brain and low expression in granulocyte is found. It is a potent protein disaggregase that chaperones the mitochondrial intermembrane space. Mutations in the CLPB gene could cause autosomal recessive metabolic disorder with intellectual disability/developmental delay, congenital neutropenia, progressive brain atrophy, movement disorder, cataracts, and 3-methylglutaconic aciduria. Recently, heterozygous, dominant negative mutations in CLPB have been identified as a cause of severe congenital neutropenia (SCN).

Structure

Gene 

The CLPB gene has 19 exons and is located at the chromosome band 11q13.4.

Protein 

Skd3 has five isoforms due to alternative splicing. Isoform 1 is considered to have the 'canonical' sequence. The protein is 78.7 kDa in size and composed of 707 amino acids. It contains an N-terminal mitochondrial targeting sequence (1-92 amino acids). After processing, the mature mitochondrial protein has a theoretical pI of 7.53. Skd3 is further processed by the mitochondrial rhomboid protease PARL at amino acid 127. Skd3 has a specific C-terminal D2 domain and proteins with this domain form the sub-family of Caseinolytic peptidase (Clp) proteins, also called HSP100. The domain composition of human Skd3 is different from that of microbial or plant orthologs. Notably, the presence of ankyrin repeats replaced the first of two ATPase domains found in bacteria and fungi.

Function 

Skd3 belongs to the HCLR clade of the large AAA+ superfamily. The unifying characteristic of this family is the hydrolysis of ATP through the AAA+ domain to produce energy required to catalyze protein unfolding, disassembly and disaggregation. Skd3 does not cooperate with HSP70, unlike its bacterial orthologue. The in vitro ATPase activity of Skd3 has been confirmed. Skd3 is a potent disaggregase in vitro and is activated by PARL to increase disaggregation activity by over 10-fold. Indeed, PARL-activated Skd3 is capable of disassembling alpha-synuclein fibrils in vitro. Even though the bacterial orthologue, ClpB, contributes to the thermotolerance of cells, it is yet unclear if Skd3 plays a similar role within mitochondria. The interaction with protein like HAX1 suggests that human Skd3 may be involved in apoptosis. Indeed, Skd3 solubilizes HAX1 in cells and the deletion of the CLPB gene in human cells has been shown to sensitize cells to apoptotic signals. In humans, the presence of ankyrin repeats replaced the first of two ATPase domains found in bacteria and fungi, which might have evolved to ensure more elaborate substrate recognition or to support a putative chaperone function. Either the ankyrin repeats alone or the AAA+ domain were found to be insufficient to support disaggregation activity. With only one ATPase domain, Skd3 is postulated competent in the use of ATP hydrolysis energy for threading unfolded polypeptide through the central channel of the hexamer ring. />

Clinical significance 

Neonatal encephalopathy is a kind of severe neurological impairment in the newborn with no specific clinical sign at the early stage of life, and its diagnosis remains a challenge. This neonatal encephalopathy includes a heterogeneous group of 3-methylglutaconic aciduria syndromes and loss of Skd3 function is reported to be one of the causes. Knocking down the clpB gene in the zebrafish induced reduction of growth and increment of motor activity, which is similar to the signs observed in patients. Its loss may lead to a broad phenotypic spectrum encompassing intellectual disability/developmental delay, congenital neutropenia, progressive brain atrophy, movement disorder, and bilateral cataracts, with 3-methylglutaconic aciduria. Further investigation into Skd3 may shed a new light on the diagnosis of this disease.

Interactions 

This protein is known to interact with:
HAX1
PARL
HTRA2
SMAC/DIABLO
OPA1
OPA3
PHB2
MICU1
MICU2
SLC25A25
SLC25A13
TIMM8A
TIMM8B
TIMM13
TIMM21
TIMM22
TIMM23
TIMM50
NDUFA8
NDUFA11
NDUFA13
NDUFB7
NDUFB10
TTC19
COX11
CYC1

References

External links

Further reading 

 
 
 

Molecular chaperones